This is a list of PRCA All-Around Champions.  The championship is awarded at the National Finals Rodeo by the Professional Rodeo Cowboys Association to the top All-Around competitor.

Notes

References

External links
PRCA Official Website

Sports trophies and awards
All-Around
PRCA
Rodeo champions
Lists of sports awards